The Leeds Rhinos–Wigan Warriors rivalry, recently branded as the War of the Roses derby, is a rugby league rivalry born from the roses rivalry and strong competitive history between the clubs with them both being considered two of the best in England.

History

The rivalry between Leeds Rhinos and Wigan Warriors is the primary representation of the roses rivalry in rugby league. Both clubs are the most decorated in their respective counties and have 33 league championships between them to date (beaten only by the collective hall of St Helens and Wigan Warriors at 38). The rivalry has been described as the most underrated rivalry in British rugby league, and having the grounds to be placed with the aforementioned Good Friday Derby between St Helens and Wigan and the Hull Derby. The rivalry was not present in the early years of rugby league, despite both clubs being founder members of the NRFU, with Leeds not winning their first league title until 1961. From then, the competitive rivalry started to intensify, but it wasn't until Wigan's period of dominance in the late 80s and 90s then Leeds's dominance in the late 00s and early 10s which saw both teams win the treble in their respective periods and the rivalry become what it is today.

Name

Since the discontinuation of the county origin series War of the Roses in 2003, the Leeds-Wigan rivalry has seemingly inherited the name in the years since only adding to the rivalry's intensity. As representatives of the largest cities in each county (Leeds and Manchester), the term "Roses Derby" is often used to describe matches between sports teams from these cities, the term has been used for a greater period of time to describe matches in football and cricket. Historically, the term referred to the rivalry between the House of Lancaster and the House of York in the counties where both clubs are located get their name.

Head to Head

Statistics correct as of 19/8/22
 
In all competitions, competitive and uncompetitive:

Meetings in major finals

1982–83 League Cup Final: Wigan 15–4 Leeds
1993–94 Challenge Cup Final: Wigan 26–16 Leeds
1994–95 Challenge Cup Final: Wigan 30–10 Leeds
1994–95 Premiership Final: Wigan 69–12 Leeds
1995–96 Charity Shield: Wigan 45–20 Leeds
1998 Super League Grand Final: Wigan 10–4 Leeds
2011 Challenge Cup Final: Wigan 28–18 Leeds
2015 Super League Grand Final: Leeds 22–20 Wigan

Collective Honours

As of the 2022 Challenge Cup Final

See also
Derbies in the Rugby Football League
Roses rivalry

Notes

References

Leeds Rhinos
Wigan Warriors
Rugby league rivalries
Sports rivalries in the United Kingdom